Alexandra Panova and Laura Thorpe were the defending champions, but both players chose not to participate.

Oksana Kalashnikova and Danka Kovinić won the title, defeating Irina Ramialison and Constance Sibille in the final, 2–6, 6–3, [10–6].

Seeds

Draw

References 
 Draw

Lorraine Open 88 - Doubles